This is a list of Hersheypark attractions giving an overview of the rides and attractions, as well as information about the rides or attractions themselves. Hersheypark currently has 76 rides and water attractions.

Present attractions

Roller coasters
Hersheypark has 13 roller coasters, the most of any amusement park in Pennsylvania.

Water rides
Hersheypark has 16 water rides, 6 of which are part of the slide complex Coastline Plunge. All of the water rides are located in The Boardwalk, except Coal Cracker, which is located in Kissing Tower Hill, near Great Bear.

Coastline Plunge
Coastline Plunge is a slide complex located in The Boardwalk. The complex features six slides with a variety of different experiences. All six slides were manufactured by ProSlide Technology. Four slides were part of the original Boardwalk expansion in 2007. Two slides, Hydro and Pipeline, were added in 2013.

Family rides
Hersheypark has 25 family rides.

Kiddie rides

Hersheypark has 20 kiddie rides. All kiddie rides are rated as a 1.

Founder's Way
The kiddie rides that were built prior to 1971 were part of an area of the park known as Kiddieland, an area of the park that existed from 1949-1971. A number of the rides in  this area of the park came from that era.

The Hollow

Kissing Tower Hill

Midway America

Pioneer Frontier

Park entertainment
This is a list of entertainment which is available in Hersheypark.
Seasonal availability

Park regions

Like most theme parks, Hersheypark also has themed regions of the park. There are 8 regions currently in the park, including ZooAmerica. For the list of former regions in Hersheypark, see List of former Hersheypark attractions, past park regions.

References
Notes

Sources

External links

 
 

 
Amusement rides lists
Pennsylvania-related lists